Kinhai is a village located in Koregaon Taluka, Satara District in Maharashtra, India. The village is divided into Pantanchi Kinhai on the western side and Peth Kinhai to the east. As of the 2011 Indian census, Kinhai had a population of 3,360.

History
In 965 CE, the village, then known as Kinhika, was donated to a Brahmin named Navashiv. It fell under the administrative unit of Ramtirthika.

Kinhai was a village of the former princely state of Aundh and was included in Koregaon Taluka after the merger of the princely states.

The Pratinidhi families were hereditary Kulkarnis or accountants of Kinhai and several of the neighbouring villages and it was from that position that Parashuram Trimbak raised himself till he was appointed the third Pratinidhi in 1700. 

In 1749, Sakhargadnivasini Temple (meaning "she who resides on top of the hill called sugar-fort") was completed. In 2014, the temple underwent a restoration effort which received a UNESCO Asia-Pacific Heritage Award.

Geography

The village lies on the banks of a feeder of the Wainganga River. To the north and north-west is a spur of steep hills at the end of which rises the ancient fort of Kalyangad (nowadays Nandgiri) (3,537ft).

On the south-east are two small hills divided by a gorge to the east of which is the temple of Yamnai Devi, the patron goddess of the Pratinidhi family. This temple of Yamai Devi has a fortified appearance and with its battlements and towers is visible for many miles on all sides throughout the Koreganv taluka. The village consists of a broad street running north-west and south-east and crossing the stream into the Peth or market quarters and thence continuing to the road mentioned up towards the temple and on through the small gorge between the two hills to Koreganv. The Pratinidhi had a handsome mansion or vada in the village, the lower part of the stone and the upper part of brick with an enclosure or court surrounded by strong walls. The mansion contains some reception rooms of handsome size and proportions in the local style. Usually one of the wives and a son of the Pratinidhi resided there. The mansion now houses the office of the vahivatdar of the Kinhai Wards' Estate and a District School Board School.

Features

On the right bank of the stream behind the Pant's mansion is a small temple of Mahadev about thirty feet by fifteen with a flight of steps leading down to the stream. It consists of an open-sided mandap and an image-chamber with a spire. The pillars are imitations of the early Hindu style. The spire is of brick with stone ornamentation. The way up to it is by the road before mentioned which close to the gorge is left on the right for a flight of 300 steps with a stone balustrade on each side. The temple court, irregular and nearly oval is entered from the west by a pointed archway with a music chamber or nagarkhana on the top. The rock is fenced with a solid masonry wall about twelve feet high from the inside, and outside in places from thirty to forty feet high. At the eastern end is a small entrance from a path communicating with a spring halfway down the south slope of the hill. There are cloisters with a terrace on the left or south side of this entrance and on the north a large solid but plain lamp pillar or deepmal. The pillar was broken years ago by lightning and as this was said to be the third time of its being struck, it was thought ominous to repair it. The temple is a plain structure about forty feet by twenty feet with a flat-roofed hall or mandap supported on three rows of four pillars about eighteen inches square at the base and plain imitations of the early Hindu style. The image-chamber or gabhara is square and contains an image of Devi in black stone ornamented with jewels and embroidered apparel and displayed with much pomp by means of a mirror casting light upon it from outside. The courtyard is paved and immediately in front of the mandap is a stone embedded in the pavement and containing vents made to receive coins to be laid in them for presentation to the goddess. A yearly fair is held, in her honour from Kartik Purnima onwards for 15 days, when about 1,00,000 people attend.

References 

 Villages in Satara district